Kenneth Leslie Buehler (November 19, 1919 – April 18, 2019) was an American professional basketball player for the Sheboygan Red Skins and the Fort Wayne Zollner Pistons. He played in two seasons for the Red Skins and, after serving in the United States Navy in World War II, Buehler returned to professional basketball and played in eight games for the Pistons. During the 1942–43 season, the Red Skins won the National Basketball League (NBL) championship with Buehler as their third-leading scorer. He averaged 7.5 points per game and was also named that season's NBL Rookie of the Year.

Upon returning from the war, Buehler played for Sheboygan in three games late in the 1945–46 season. The following season, he played in only eight games for Fort Wayne before retiring from professional basketball due to a knee problem. He then attended Marquette University's dental school and became a dentist in his post-basketball career.

Buehler died in April 2019 at the age of 99 in Rhinelander, Wisconsin.

References

1919 births
2019 deaths
American dentists
American men's basketball players
United States Navy personnel of World War II
Basketball players from Wisconsin
Centers (basketball)
Forwards (basketball)
Fort Wayne Zollner Pistons players
Marquette University alumni
Milwaukee Panthers men's basketball players
People from Marathon County, Wisconsin
Sheboygan Red Skins players
Sportspeople from Palm Beach, Florida
20th-century dentists